471143 Dziewanna , exact: , provisional designation , is a trans-Neptunian object in the scattered disc, orbiting the Sun in the outermost region of the Solar System.

It was discovered on 13 March 2010, by astronomers Andrzej Udalski, Scott Sheppard, Marcin Kubiak and Chad Trujillo at the Las Campanas Observatory in Chile. The discovery was made during the Polish OGLE project of Warsaw University. Based on its absolute magnitude and assumed albedo, it has a diameter of approximately 470 kilometers.

It was named after Devana (Polish form: Dziewanna), a Slavic goddess of the wilderness, forests and the hunt.

Distance 

The minor planet orbits the Sun at a distance of 32.6–108.3 AU once every 591 years and 4 months (215,992 days). Its orbit has an eccentricity of 0.54 and an inclination of 29° with respect to the ecliptic.

It is currently 39.1 AU from the Sun and will reach perihelion in 2038. A ten-million-year integration of the orbit shows that this object is in a 2:7 resonance with Neptune.

A first precovery was taken by the Near-Earth Asteroid Tracking at Palomar Observatory in 2002, extending the minor planet's observation arc by 8 years prior to its discovery observation. Since then it has been observed 143 times over 6 oppositions and has an orbit quality of 1.

Physical properties 

Published in May 2013, a rotational lightcurve for this minor planet was obtained from photometric observations at the discovering observatory with the 2.5-meter Irénée du Pont Telescope. It gave a rotation period of  hours with a brightness variation of 0.12 magnitude.

Observations by American astronomer Michael Brown, using the Keck telescope in March 2012, suggest that there is no satellite, and therefore no immediate means to determine its mass.

See also

References

External links 
 MPEC 2010 G50 : 2010 EK139, Minor Planet Electronic Circular, issued on 8 April 2010
 OCKS: OGLE Carnegie Kuiper belt Survey (OCKS is a Southern sky survey searching for Kuiper-belt objects and dwarf planets)
 List Of Centaurs and Scattered-Disk Objects, Minor Planet Center
 

471143
471143
Discoveries by Andrzej Udalski
Discoveries by Scott S. Sheppard
Discoveries by Chad Trujillo
Named minor planets
471143
471143
20100313